Actium or Aktion was a town on a promontory in ancient Acarnania at the entrance of the Ambraciot Gulf, off which Octavian gained his celebrated victory, the Battle of Actium, over Antony and Cleopatra, on September 2, 31 BCE.

History

Actium belonged originally to the Corinthian colonists of Anactorium, who probably founded the sanctuary of Apollo Actius. This temple was of great antiquity.  In the 3rd century BCE it fell to the Acarnanians, who subsequently held their religious summits there.

There was also an ancient festival named Actia, celebrated here in honour of the god. Augustus after his victory enlarged the temple, and revived the ancient festival, which was henceforth celebrated once in five years (πενταετηρίς, ludi quinquennales), with musical and gymnastic contests, and horse races. We learn from a Greek inscription found on the site of Actium, and which is probably prior to the time of Augustus, that the chief priest of the temple was called Ἱεραπόλος, and that his name was employed in official documents, like that of the first Archon at Athens, to mark the date. Strabo says that the temple was situated on an eminence, and that below was a plain with a grove of trees, and a dock-yard; and in another passage he describes the harbour as situated outside of the gulf. On the opposite coast of Epirus, Augustus founded the city of Nicopolis in honour of his victory. After the foundation of Nicopolis, a few buildings sprang up around the temple, and it served as a kind of suburb to Nicopolis.

Archaeology
On October 8, 1980, the Greek Ministry of Transport and Communications reported that shipwrecks from the Battle of Actium had been located at Actium near the entrance to the Ambracan Gulf.

In Summer 2009, archaeologists discovered the ruins of the Temple of Apollo and found two statue heads, one of Apollo, one of Artemis (Diana).

See also
Battle of Actium
 List of ancient Greek cities
 Preveza the nearest modern town, connected by a 1.5 km long tunnel

References

External links

Ancient Greek archaeological sites in Greece
Archaeological sites in Western Greece
Corinthian colonies
Former populated places in Greece
Populated places in ancient Acarnania
Populated places in ancient Greece
Roman sites in Greece